Long Term Parking station is a station of the Incheon Airport Maglev in Unseo-dong, Jung District, Incheon, South Korea.  It is the first station after Incheon International Airport itself.

References 

Metro stations in Incheon
Jung District, Incheon
Railway stations opened in 2016
2016 establishments in South Korea
Incheon Airport Maglev